Swami Vivekananda is a 1955 Hindi language Indian feature film produced and directed by Amar Mullick, starring Ajit Prakash, Bharati Devi, Anubha Gupta Manoranjan Bhattachary etc. The film was based on the biography of Indian Hindu monk Swami Vivekananda. The film is considered a "faithful and memorable documentation feature" on Vivekananda.

Plot 
The eventful life of Swami Vivekananda, his teachings, thoughts, contribution towards society and his relation with his teacher Ramakrishna Paramahamsa are shown in this film. The film has captured different events from his life starting from his childhood days to his college days, meeting with his master Ramakrishna at Dakshineswar, relationship with Ramakrishna, austerities undertaken by him and other monastic disciples of Ramakrishna, etc.

Cast
The film, directed by Amar Mullick has the following main cast.
 Ajit Prakash
 Bharati Devi
 Anubha Gupta
 Manoranjan Bhattacharya

Production 
The film was produced by Amar Mallick Productions and directed by  Amar Mallick). The music of the film was composed by Rai Chand Boral (known as R.C. Boral) of the New Theatres and Salil Choudhury.

Soundtracks 
There are three soundtracks sung by Asha Bhosle and K J Yesudas.

Release and reception 
The film was released in 1955 and received mainly positive reviews from critics. According to The Indian Express, the film is a "faithful and memorable documentation feature" on Swami Vivekananda. T. M. Ramachandran, wrote in his book 70 years of Indian cinema, 1913-1983, that the film "will ever remain enshrined in the memories of the viewers. The film brought to graphic view the exploits of this cyclonic sage of India".

See also 
 Bireswar Vivekananda, 1964 Bengali film

References

External links 
 
 Swami Vivekananda Movie

1950s Hindi-language films
1955 films
Films about Swami Vivekananda
Indian biographical films
Biographical films about religious leaders
1950s biographical films